Monarch Glen is a rural locality in the City of Logan, Queensland, Australia. It is situated along the development corridor south of Brisbane in the Greater Flagstone development area

History
Monarch Glen is situated in the Bundjalung traditional Indigenous Australian country. 

The origin of the suburb name is from the monarch butterfly (Danaus plexippus), which is found locally.

Monarch Glen was approved and designated as a locality within the Logan City  by the Department of Natural Resources and Mines in May 2016.

References

Suburbs of Logan City
Localities in Queensland